Eremophila eriocalyx, commonly known as desert pride, is a flowering plant in the figwort family, Scrophulariaceae and is endemic to Western Australia. It is an erect shrub with greyish leaves, very hairy sepals and petals that range in colour from white to yellow, sometimes pink or purple.

Description
The leaves are arranged alternately along the branches and are linear to lance-shaped with the edges thickened and turned under.

They are a shade of cream to yellow, white or sometimes purple to pinkish-purple. The petal tube is mostly covered with glandular hairs except for the inner side of the petal lobes. The inside of the tube is filled with woolly hairs. The 4 stamens are enclosed in the petal tube sometimes equalling it in length.

Taxonomy and naming
The species was first formally described in 1859 by Victorian Government Botanist Ferdinand von Mueller in Fragmenta Phytographiae Australiae. His description was based on plant material collected by Augustus Frederick Oldfield near the Murchison River. The specific epithet (eriocalyx) is derived from the ancient Greek erion (ἔριον), "wool" and kalyx (κάλυξ), "calyx", and "refers to the distinctive woolly sepals".

Distribution and habitat
Desert pride is widespread from the coast of Western Australia between Geraldton and Kalbarri and eastwards to near the Plumridge Lakes. It grows in a wide range of soils, often in mulga woodland.

Conservation status
Eremophila eriocalyx is classified as "not threatened" by the Western Australian Government Department of Parks and Wildlife.

Use in horticulture
This eremophila has attractive flowers - yellow buds appear between woolly sepals then open to white with a lemon or creamy tinge, although other colour forms occur. It can be propagated by cuttings but in humid areas preferably by grafting onto Myoporum rootstock. It will grow in most soils, although more slowly in clay soils, in full sun or partial shade, is both drought tolerant and frost hardy, and is long lived in the garden situation.

References

eriocalyx
Eudicots of Western Australia
Plants described in 1859
Endemic flora of Western Australia
Taxa named by Ferdinand von Mueller